The Midwest Prep Hockey League (abbreviated MPHL) is a highly elite prep school ice hockey league in North America. The Midwest Prep League was founded in 2000; the original six league members were Culver Academies (IN), Gilmour Academy (OH), Lake Forest Academy (IL), Park Tudor School (IN), Shady Side Academy (PA). Since its inception the league has grown to ten Division 1 level prep school teams across the United States and Canada. The MPHL aids in preparing student athletes for college ice hockey and other higher levels of hockey. The league has maintained a competitive level of play throughout the USA and Canada, and has scheduled "Showcase" Weekends for scouts to see all the teams & players at one site . Many former MPHL players have gone on to play in NCAA college hockey at a variety of levels. The founders of the league were John Malloy (Gilmour Academy), Dave Erickson (Lake Forest Academy), Len Semplice (Shady Side Academy), and John Bowers (St. Francis HS).

Many MPHL players have gone on to compete in professional and college hockey.

MPHL Alumni
A number of notable MPHL alumni have gone to play college, junior, and professional hockey.

MPHL Alumni Who Played/Worked in the NHL
 Steve Gainey - Dallas Stars/ St. Andrew's College
 Patrick Kaleta - Buffalo Sabres/ St. Francis High School
 Ryan Suter - Nashville Predators- U.S. Olympian/ Culver Military Academy
 Blake Geoffrion - Montreal Canadiens- U.S. Olympian/ Culver Military Academy
 Mark Jankowski - Calgary Flames/ Stanstead College
 Alex DeBrincat - Chicago Blackhawks/ Lake Forest Academy
 John Gilmour - Buffalo Sabres/ Gilmour Academy
 Noah Dobson - Bishop's College School
 Dawson Mercer - Bishop's College School

MPHL Schools Alumni Who played/ Worked in the NHL before league Started
 Kevin Dean - New Jersey Devils/ Culver Military Academy
 Greg Hotham - Pittsburgh Penguins/ St. Andrew's College
 Todd Krygier - Mighty Ducks of Anaheim / St. Francis High School
 John-Michael Liles - Boston Bruins- U.S. Olympian/ Culver Military Academy
 Aaron Miller - Vancouver Canucks- U.S. Olympian/ St. Francis High School
 Al Montoya - Montreal Canadiens / Loyola Academy
 Teddy Purcell - Los Angeles Kings/ Lake Forest Academy
 Lee Stempniak - Carolina Hurricanes / St. Francis High School
 Gary Suter - Calgary Flames, Chicago Blackhawks/ Culver Military Academy
 Mike Iggulden - New York Islanders / Ridley College
 Jere Gillis - Bishop's College School
 Edward Bronfman -  Bishop's College School
 Hartland Molson/ Molson Family  - Bishop's College School

League Champions

2021-2022 Bishop's College School

2019-2020 Ridley College

2018-2019 Ridley College

2017-2018 Ridley College

2016-2017 Lake Forest Academy

2015-2016 Ridley College

2014-2015 Ridley College

2012-2013 Edge School

2011-2012 Stanstead College

2010-2011 Edge School

2009-2010 St. Andrew's College

2008-2009 Lake Forest Academy

2007-2008 St. Andrew's College

2006-2007 St. Andrew's College

2005-2006 St. Francis High School

2004-2005 St. Andrew's College

2003-2004 National Sports Academy

2002-2003 Orchard Lake St. Mary's

2001-2002 Park Tudor

2000-2001 Grayson

Award winners

Best GAA Dekon Randell-Snow

League Records

See also
List of ice hockey leagues

External links
 Official Site

Ice hockey leagues in the United States